The Queens Community Board 8 is a local government in the New York City borough of Queens, encompassing the neighborhoods of Briarwood, Cunningham Heights, Flushing South, Fresh Meadows, Hillcrest, Hilltop Village, Holliswood, Jamaica Estates, Jamaica Hills, Kew Gardens Hills, Pomonok, and Utopia. It is delimited by the Long Island Expressway to Hillside Avenue and from the Van Wyck Expressway to the Clearview Expressway.

References

External links 
Queens Community Board 8
Profile of the Community Board

Community boards of Queens